Birdatta Choudhury was a rebel, who with his brother Haradatta Choudhury tried to rebelled against the Ahom monarchy with the help of Burkandazes, however he was captured and his eye balls were extracted and sent of Jorhat

References

Kamrupi people